French Reef is a coral reef located within the Florida Keys National Marine Sanctuary. It lies 11 km southeast of Key Largo, within the Key Largo Existing Management Area, which is immediately to the east of John Pennekamp Coral Reef State Park.  French Reef is northeast of Molasses Reef. Part of the reef lies within a Sanctuary Preservation Area (SPA), which is 37 ha in area. A number of caves and arches in a spur and groove formation are included in the SPA.

Gallery

External links
 
 NOAA National Marine Sanctuary Maps, Florida Keys East
 NOAA website on French Reef
 NOAA Navigational Chart 11464
 Benthic Habitat Map

Coral reefs of the Florida Keys
Underwater diving sites in the United States